Mergus is the genus of the typical mergansers  , fish-eating ducks in the subfamily Anatinae. The genus name is a Latin word used by Pliny the Elder and other Roman authors to refer to an unspecified waterbird.

The common merganser (Mergus merganser) and red-breasted merganser (M. serrator) have broad ranges in the northern hemisphere. The Brazilian merganser (M. octosetaceus) is a South American duck, and one of the six most threatened waterfowl in the world, with possibly fewer than 250 birds in the wild. The scaly-sided merganser or "Chinese merganser" (M. squamatus) is an endangered species. It lives in temperate East Asia, breeding in the north and wintering in the south.

The hooded merganser (Lophodytes cucullatus, formerly known as Mergus cucullatus) is not of this genus but is closely related. The other "aberrant" merganser, the smew (Mergellus albellus), is phylogenetically closer to goldeneyes (Bucephala).

Although they are seaducks, most of the mergansers prefer riverine habitats, with only the red-breasted merganser being common at sea. These large fish-eaters typically have black-and-white, brown and/or green hues in their plumage, and most have somewhat shaggy crests. All have serrated edges to their long and thin bills that help them grip their prey. Along with the smew and hooded merganser, they are therefore often known as "sawbills". The goldeneyes, on the other hand, feed mainly on mollusks, and therefore have a more typical duck-bill.

Mergus ducks are also classified as "diving ducks" because they submerge completely in looking for food. In other traits, however, the genera Mergus, Lophodytes, Mergellus, and Bucephala are very similar: uniquely among all Anseriformes, they do not have notches at the hind margin of their sternum, but holes surrounded by bone.

Taxonomy
The genus Mergus was introduced in 1758 by the Swedish naturalist Carl Linnaeus in the tenth edition of his Systema Naturae. The genus name is the Latin word for an unidentified waterbird mentioned by Pliny the Elder and other authors; some sources have identified the original mergus as referring to either a cormorant or Scopoli's shearwater. The type species was designated as the common merganser (Mergus merganser) by Thomas Campbell Eyton in 1838.

Recent species
The genus contains four living species and two recently extinct species.

Fossil species 
Some fossil members of this genus have been described:
 Mergus miscellus is known from the Middle Miocene Calvert Formation (Barstovian, c.14 million years ago) of Virginia, USA.
 Mergus connectens lived in the Early Pleistocene about 2–1 million years ago, in Central and Eastern Europe.

The Early Oligocene booby "Sula" ronzoni was at first mistakenly believed to be a typical merganser. A Late Serravallian  (13–12 million years ago) fossil sometimes attributed to Mergus, found in the Sajóvölgyi Formation of Mátraszőlős, Hungary, probably belongs to Mergellus. The affiliations of the mysterious "Anas" albae from the Messinian (c. 7–5 million years ago) of Hungary are undetermined; it was initially believed to be a typical merganser too.

References

Bibliography

 Mlíkovský, Jirí (2002b): Cenozoic Birds of the World, Part 1: Europe. Ninox Press, Prague.

 
Bird genera
Ducks

Langhian first appearances
Extant Miocene first appearances
Taxa named by Carl Linnaeus